Sieborowice  is a village in the administrative district of Gmina Michałowice, within Kraków County, Lesser Poland Voivodeship, in southern Poland.

The village has a population of 260.

References

Sieborowice